James Broadbent (born 24 May 1949) is an English actor. A graduate of the London Academy of Music and Dramatic Art in 1972, he came to prominence as a prolific character actor for his many roles in film and television. He's received various accolades including an Academy Award, two BAFTA Awards, and two Golden Globe Awards as well as nominations for two Primetime Emmy Awards and a Grammy Award.

He received an Academy Award for his supporting role as John Bayley in the film Iris (2001). Broadbent won BAFTA Award for Best Actor in a Supporting Role for Moulin Rouge! (2001). His early film roles include in Terry Gilliam films Time Bandits (1981) and Brazil (1985) before a breakthrough role in Mike Leigh's Life Is Sweet (1990). Notable film roles include Bullets Over Broadway (1994), Topsy-Turvy (1999), Bridget Jones's Diary (2001), Gangs of New York (2002), Another Year (2010), The Iron Lady (2011), Cloud Atlas (2012) and Brooklyn (2015). 

He gained attention for playing Digory Kirke in The Chronicles of Narnia: The Lion, the Witch and the Wardrobe (2005), and Horace Slughorn in the Harry Potter film series and for his roles in Indiana Jones and the Kingdom of the Crystal Skull (2008), and in the Paddington film series.

Broadbent's television roles include playing Roy Slater in the BBC sitcom Only Fools and Horses, Desmond Morton in the HBO / BBC film The Gathering Storm (2002), and Lord Longford in the Channel 4 film Longford (2006). He also gained attention for his role as Archmaester Ebrose in the seventh season of the HBO fantasy series Game of Thrones in 2017.

Early life
James Broadbent was born on 24 May 1949 in Holton cum Beckering, in Lincolnshire, the second son of Doreen "Dee" Broadbent (née Findlay), a sculptor and Roy Laverick Broadbent, an artist, sculptor, interior designer and furniture maker. Broadbent's parents were both amateur actors who co-founded the Holton Players acting troupe at Holton. The two have been described by the BBC as conscientious objectors who "worked the land" rather than participate in World War II. In Wickenby, a former Methodist Chapel was purchased in 1970 by Holton Players, who converted it into a 100-seat theatre, named Broadbent Theatre in memory of Roy Broadbent, who designed the conversion.

Broadbent was educated at Leighton Park School, a Quaker school in Reading, and briefly attended art college before transferring to the London Academy of Music and Dramatic Art. He graduated in 1972. His early stage work included appearances as Patrick Barlow's assistant in the mock National Theatre of Brent.

Career

1980s

Broadbent's early stagework included a number of productions for The National Theatre of Brent as the downtrodden assistant Wallace to Patrick Barlow's self-important actor-manager character Desmond Olivier Dingle. Broadbent and Barlow played many male and female character roles in comically less-than-epic tellings of historical and religious stories, such as The Complete Guide to Sex, The Greatest Story Ever Told, Revolution!!, and All The World's A Globe. These were hits at the Edinburgh Fringe, in London, and on tour. Later stage work included the original productions of Kafka's Dick (1986) and Our Country's Good (1988) at the Royal Court Theatre and work for the Royal National Theatre including "The Government Inspector". Work on the stage with Mike Leigh includes Goosepimples and Ecstasy. He had worked with Stephen Frears in The Hit (1984) and Terry Gilliam in Time Bandits (1981) and Brazil (1985).

Broadbent also appeared in 1983, 1985 and 1991 as DCI Roy Slater, an associate character in the enormously popular sitcom Only Fools and Horses. The character appeared in three episodes over an eight-year period. He had originally been offered the lead role of Del Boy in the series, but he turned it down due to other commitments. He has also played a role in the Inspector Morse series. Further comic roles include the lead role in the sitcom The Peter Principle and occasional guest appearances in Not The Nine O'Clock News and Victoria Wood As Seen on TV. He portrayed Don Speekingleesh in "The Queen of Spain's Beard" in the first series of The Black Adder in 1983. He played Prince Albert in Blackadder's Christmas Carol, first broadcast in 1988. He joined Rowan Atkinson in his Spider-Man spoof Spider-Plant Man, as a disgruntled Batman, envious of Spider-Plant Man's success.

1990s
Broadbent's film breakthrough came in Mike Leigh's independent British comedy drama Life Is Sweet (1990). In the 1990s he established himself as a character actor in films including Mike Newell's period romance Enchanted April (1991), Neil Jordan's thriller The Crying Game (1992), Woody Allen's 1920s-set showbiz comedy Bullets over Broadway (1994) and Richard Loncraine's film adaptation of Richard III (1995). He appeared in broad fantasy comedy The Borrowers (1997) with John Goodman and the musical comedy Little Voice (1998) with Michael Caine. Broadbent ended the decade by taking a leading role in another Mike Leigh film, Topsy-Turvy (1999), playing dramatist Sir William S. Gilbert. He played the Shy Doctor in the 1999 Comic Relief parody Doctor Who sketch Doctor Who and the Curse of Fatal Death.

2000s
In 2001, Broadbent starred in three of the year's most successful films: Richard Curtis' Bridget Jones's Diary, Baz Luhrmann's Moulin Rouge! and Richard Eyre's Iris, for which he won an Academy Award for Best Supporting Actor for his performance. In 2002, he appeared in Martin Scorsese's Gangs of New York and in the film adaptation of Dickens' Nicholas Nickleby. In 2005, Broadbent appeared in the film adaptation of C.S. Lewis' classic children's fantasy novel The Chronicles of Narnia: The Lion, the Witch and the Wardrobe as Professor Kirke. That same year Broadbent had voice roles in Robots, Valiant and The Magic Roundabout.

Broadbent played the lead role of the TV film Wide-Eyed and Legless. Based on a true story, the drama tells of Deric Longden's wife, Diana and her fight against a mysterious wasting illness which turned out to be myalgic encephalomyelitis. It began as a type of flu but it grew progressively worse. She was subject to blackouts and became so debilitated that she could barely get out of her wheelchair. It led to years of pain and paralysis that ended in her death. Broadbent portrayed the title role in the Channel 4 drama Longford in October 2006, earning a BAFTA TV Award, a Golden Globe and a 2007 Emmy nomination for his performance as Frank Pakenham (1905–2001), Earl of Longford, which was centred on Longford's ultimately unsuccessful campaign for the parole of Myra Hindley from her life imprisonment for the Moors Murders.

Broadbent appeared as Inspector Frank Butterman in Hot Fuzz in 2007; and also in the original radio production of The Hitchhiker's Guide to the Galaxy in 1978, playing the character Vroomfondel. Forty years later, he took the role of Marvin in the Hexagonal Phase radio series. He was also a regular in Stephen Fry's radio comedy show Saturday Night Fry, which aired on BBC Radio 4 in 1988. In 2008, he starred as pro-Newtonian physicist Sir Oliver Lodge in the fact-based single drama Einstein and Eddington for the BBC.

Broadbent also appeared in the fourth film in the Indiana Jones series, Indiana Jones and the Kingdom of the Crystal Skull (2008) directed by Steven Spielberg; and in The Young Victoria (2009) alongside Emily Blunt as King William IV. Broadbent joined a long list of British actors by appearing in Harry Potter and the Half-Blood Prince, as well as the final movie in the series Harry Potter and the Deathly Hallows – Part 2 as Horace Slughorn

In 2009, he portrayed Sam Longson, chairman of Derby County football club in the 1960s and 1970s, in the film The Damned United; the starring character in the film was football manager Brian Clough, played by Michael Sheen. In 2010, he provided the voice for the character Major Mouse in a series of radio advertisements and one produced for television for an energy company, E.ON, for their eonenergyfit.com website campaign. He also starred as the older Logan Mountstuart in the TV adaptation of William Boyd's novel Any Human Heart. He had a lead role in Exile, a BBC One drama, starring John Simm and written by Danny Brocklehurst.

2010s
In 2010, Broadbent reunited with director Mike Leigh, in Another Year with Ruth Sheen and Lesley Manville. The film premiered at the 2010 Cannes Film Festival in competition for the Palme d'Or. According to review aggregation website, Rotten Tomatoes, 93% of critics have given the film a positive review, with the critical consensus reading, "Characterized by strong performances and the director's trademark feel for the nuances of everyday life, Another Year marks another solid entry in Mike Leigh's career of kitchen-sink English drama."

In 2012, he played Denis Thatcher opposite Meryl Streep as the former Prime Minister in The Iron Lady. Broadbent nominated her for a BAFTA Award for her performance. That same year he also starred in Cloud Atlas.
In 2014, he starred in Roger Mitchell's critically acclaimed drama film, Le Week-End alongside Lindsay Duncan. Film review aggregator Rotten Tomatoes reports that 89% of critics gave the film a positive review based on 148 reviews, with an average score of 7.4/10. The website's critical consensus states: "Topped with bittersweet humor but possessing surprisingly thorny depths, Le Week-End offers a sophisticated, well-acted portrait of late-life struggles and long-term marriage."

In 2015, Broadbent starred in the Oscar nominated film Brooklyn alongside Saoirse Ronan, Domhnaal Gleeson and Julie Walters. On the review aggregator Rotten Tomatoes, the film holds an approval rating of 97% based on 256 reviews, with an average rating of 8.4/10. The site's critical consensus reads, "Brooklyn buttresses outstanding performances from Saoirse Ronan and Emory Cohen with a rich period drama that tugs at the heartstrings as deftly as it satisfies the mind." The film was nominated for four Academy Awards including Best Picture. Later that year, he also appeared in a role in Alan Bennett's comedy film The Lady in the Van (2015) alongside Maggie Smith and Alex Jennings.

In 2015, Broadbent along with Daniel Rigby, Antonia Thomas, Fearne Cotton and Jane Horrocks are revealed to be the new cast with Broadbent as a Voice Trumpet in the reboot of classic British children's television series Teletubbies. Since 2016, Broadbent narrates Kevin the Carrot Christmas adverts for the UK branch of Aldi. In the 2020 advert, Broadbent portrayed Santa Claus, who was revealed to be the narrator.
Broadbent has also appeared in the critically acclaimed British comedy films, Paddington (2014) and Paddington 2 (2018) alongside Hugh Bonneville, Sally Hawkins, Julie Walters and Ben Whishaw.

In 2016, he was cast in the seventh season of the HBO series Game of Thrones. In 2017 he starred in the ensemble thriller The Sense of an Ending alongside Charlotte Rampling, Michelle Dockery, and Emily Mortimer. The film premiered at the Palm Springs International Film Festival to positive reviews. According to the critical consensus on Rotten Tomatoes, the film is, "Anchored by a strong starring performance by Jim Broadbent", while the film "proves consistently gripping". On 28 May 2018, he played Gloucester in the BBC Two production of King Lear acting alongside Anthony Hopkins, Emma Thompson and Florence Pugh.

In 2018, he played Hans Christian Andersen in the premiere of Martin McDonagh's play A Very Very Very Dark Matter at the Bridge Theatre in London.

2020s
In 2020, Broadbent starred in the limited series Black Narcissus based on the classic Powell and Pressburger film. The series premiered on 23 November 2020 on FX. The series also stars Gemma Arterton, Alessandro Nivola and Diana Rigg.

Broadbent starred in Roger Michell's comedy drama film The Duke opposite Helen Mirren. The film had its world premiere at the Venice International Film Festival on 4 September 2020 and was pushed to be released in cinemas in the UK on 25 February 2021 because of the COVID-19 pandemic.

Writing
In 2018, Broadbent's first graphic novel Dull Margaret was published by Fantagraphics Books.

Filmography

Selected filmography

Personal life
Broadbent has been married to painter and former theatre designer Anastasia Lewis since 1987. He has no children, but Lewis has two sons from a previous relationship.

Broadbent primarily lives in the Lincolnshire Wolds. He also owns a property in London.

He is an atheist.

Awards and honours

Broadbent received his Academy Award for Best Supporting Actor for his performance in Richard Eyre's Iris (2001) starring alongside Judi Dench. That same year he won his British Academy Film Award for his performance in Baz Luhrmann's Moulin Rouge! (2001). In 2007, he received a British Academy Television Award for his work in Tom Hooper's television film, Longford (2007). He has received two Golden Globe Awards for his performances in Iris (2001) and Longford (2007). He also received two Primetime Emmy Award nominations for his performance as Desmond Morton in the BBC/HBO production The Gathering Storm (2002) and as Lord Longford in Longford (2007).

Broadbent was offered an OBE in 2002, but he declined it, stating that there were more deserving recipients than actors and that the British Empire was not something he wanted to "celebrate". Broadbent was made an Honorary Associate of London Film School.

References

External links

Jim Broadbent | Culture | The Guardian
Jim Broadbent at the British Film Institute

1949 births
Alumni of the London Academy of Music and Dramatic Art
Audiobook narrators
Best Actor BAFTA Award (television) winners
Best Miniseries or Television Movie Actor Golden Globe winners
Best Supporting Actor Academy Award winners
Best Supporting Actor BAFTA Award winners
Best Supporting Actor Golden Globe (film) winners
International Emmy Award for Best Actor winners
English atheists
English male film actors
English male stage actors
English male television actors
English male voice actors
Living people
People educated at Leighton Park School
People from Lincoln, England
Volpi Cup for Best Actor winners
20th-century English male actors
21st-century English male actors
Male actors from Lincolnshire
People from West Lindsey District